T is the third Japanese studio album (sixth overall) by South Korean pop group Tohoshinki, released on January 22, 2008 by Rhythm Zone. It at #4 on the Oricon weekly charts. The album's biggest competition in sales was with Zard's "Zard Request Best: Beautiful Memory", the last album after its lead vocalist Izumi Sakai's death in 2007.

According to the members, the "T" stands for several things, such as "Tohoshinki", "Title", "Third" album, "Top" and "Try". It could also stand for "Trick/Trust" and the group's "Teamwork".
A week before the album's release, the single " Purple Line" had debuted and reached #1 in Oricon weekly sales.

The management played a different strategy to promote the album by splitting the members into teams which travelled separately to different cities in Japan for a week and appeared on radio shows and TV programs.

The song "Kiss したまま、さよなら" was specially composed and written by members Micky Yoochun and Hero Jaejoong, included only in 2CD+2DVD version. The song Trick is a song that is a mix of 5 songs (released after the album), each dedicated to a separate member. The first letter in the following five singles spell out the name 'Trick'.

Music videos
Several songs in the album were singles previously released which had associated music videos, however not all are included in the DVD of the album.
List of songs with PVs, in order of release:
 "Lovin' You"
 "Summer Dream"
 "Shine/Ride On"
 "Last Angel"
 "Forever Love"
 "Together"
 "Purple Line"

Track listing

Notes
 CD + DVD and 2 CD + 2 DVD versions do not include tracks 14 & 15 ("Forever Love (Acappella version)" & "Lovin' You (Haru's "Deep Water" Mix)")

Release history

Charts and sales

Oricon sales charts (Japan)

Korea foreign albums & singles chart

Singles included in album

References

2008 albums
TVXQ albums
Avex Group albums
Japanese-language albums